Edward Duffield Neill (1823 – 1893) was an American author and educator.

Neill was born in Philadelphia. After studying at the University of Pennsylvania for some time, he enrolled at Amherst College and graduated from Amherst in 1842, then studied theology at Andover. 
After ordination as a Presbyterian minister, he moved to St. Paul, Minnesota, in 1848 where he became pastor of the First Presbyterian church. He also worked as Superintendent of Public Instruction for the Minnesota Territory in 1851–53, and served as chancellor of the University of Minnesota from 1858–61.

During the Civil War he served in the army as a regimental chaplain with the 1st Minnesota Volunteers from 1861 to 1862 and as a hospital chaplain from 1862 to 1863.  He worked for Presidents Lincoln and Johnson, who in 1869 nominated him United States Commissioner of Education to replace Henry Barnard, however, President Grant appointed him Consul to Dublin in 1869.

He returned to the United States in 1870, and served as the president of Macalester College in St. Paul in 1873–74, thenceforth as professor of history and literature.

He wrote many historical books, mostly of the Colonial period.

Partial bibliography  
 History of Minnesota (1858; fifth edition, 1883)  
 Terra Mariœ (1867), a history of early Maryland    
 History of the Virginia Company of London (1869)  
 English Colonization of America during the Seventeenth Century (1871)  
 Minnesota Explorers and Pioneers (1881)  
 Virginia Vetusta (1885)  
 Virginia Carolorum (1886)

References

 

1823 births
1893 deaths
American Presbyterian ministers
Union Army chaplains
19th-century American historians
19th-century American male writers
Writers from Philadelphia
Amherst College alumni
Writers from Saint Paul, Minnesota
Macalester College faculty
People of Minnesota in the American Civil War
American consuls
Macalester College
19th-century American diplomats
Historians from Pennsylvania
19th-century American clergy
American male non-fiction writers